Hemaris molli is a moth of the family Sphingidae. The species was first described by Ulf Eitschberger, Günter C. Müller and Vasiliy D. Kravchenko in 2005. It is known from Jordan.

It is not clear if Hemaris molli is a valid species. It looks superficially like Hemaris fuciformis, although it lacks the dividing line of scales in the forewing cell. Furthermore, the genitalial preparation is close to that of Hemaris radians. The exact relationship between these taxa still needs to be clarified.

It is similar to Hemaris galunae, but the antennae are somewhat shorter. The forewing and hindwing marginal bands are broader than in related species. The forewing has a vein remnant running through it longitudinally. The basal field and inner edge angle of the hindwing upperside are extended, dark brown and scarcely lightened.

References

M
Endemic fauna of Jordan
Moths of Asia
Moths of the Middle East
Moths described in 2005